The Informer is a 2019 British crime thriller film directed by Andrea Di Stefano and written by Matt Cook, based on the novel Three Seconds by Roslund & Hellström. The film stars Joel Kinnaman, Rosamund Pike, Common, Ana de Armas, and Clive Owen.

Plot
Several years ago, Peter Koslow was released early from prison on condition that he work as an undercover informant for the FBI's New York City field office. Having worked his way into a Polish crime organization, he is about to provide his handler, Special Agent Wilcox, with substantial evidence to indict crime boss Ryszard "The General" Klimek. Koslow is outfitted with a wire as he smuggles a large amount of fentanyl through the Polish consulate's office with the intention of it being delivered to the General. However, Koslow's cohort Staszek learns of a potential buyer and instead veers off-plan. Meeting with the buyer, Koslow quickly deduces that he is an undercover police officer. When tensions arise, the officer attempts to apprehend Koslow, but Staszek kills him. Listening to this over the wire, Koslow's handlers abandon him. Koslow and Staszek are brought before the General, and Koslow is told he will be required to return to prison in order to run the drug trade on the General's behalf. Initially reluctant, Koslow agrees after the lives of his wife and daughter are threatened.

Wilcox informs Koslow that he will continue to act as an informant while imprisoned, and in return he will be freed upon completion. Meanwhile, NYPD Detective Grens begins to investigate the murder of the undercover officer and suspects the Polish Mafia. He obtains security camera recordings of Koslow leaving the scene and the FBI vehicle driving by. The General and his wife visit with Koslow and his wife, Sofia, in preparation for Koslow's return to prison. The following day, Koslow breaks his parole. Grens meets with Wilcox and Montgomery, who deny knowledge of the murder. He also speaks with Sofia, who refuses to divulge information about her husband. Meanwhile, Koslow begins his drug distribution but is thwarted by corrupt prison officer Slewitt who works for Smiley Phelps, the boss of the prison gang who holds sway over the drug trade. Koslow is nearly killed until he reveals to Smiley that he is an informant working to take down the General, Smiley's competition. Koslow calls Wilcox for help, but she is unable to help after being ordered by Montgomery to "burn" Koslow to cover up the FBI's involvement in the operation that led to the murder of the undercover police officer. Koslow then calls Sofia, asking her to give Grens the secret audio recordings he taped while speaking with Wilcox.

Wilcox reluctantly leaks to the General's attorney that Koslow is an FBI informant, and the General orders him and his family to be killed. Koslow is attacked and nearly killed by a Polish gangster but manages to subdue his assailant. In an act of desperation, he takes Slewitt hostage and renders him unconscious. Meanwhile, Wilcox confronts Sofia and takes possession of the tapes. At the prison, Montgomery has taken command of the hostage situation and Koslow, using his past experience as a U.S. Special Forces sniper, enacts a means of escape when he switches outfits with Slewitt and strategically places a propane tank behind them, causing a sniper to mistakenly kill Slewitt and hit the tank, triggering a massive explosion. Staszek and another Polish gangster attempt to kill Koslow's family, but Grens arrives and thwarts them. Grens is shot but Sofia saves him and both gangsters are ultimately killed.

Koslow is transferred via ambulance and awakens to find that Wilcox is his escort. She allows Koslow to escape as retribution for her actions. In NYC, Wilcox confronts Montgomery and has him arrested after she wears a wire to record him threatening to kill Koslow to cover up his actions. Grens and Wilcox partner to help Koslow and protect his family, sending Koslow into hiding until the FBI investigation into the corruption is concluded and he can be a free man.

Cast
 Joel Kinnaman as Peter Koslow
 Rosamund Pike as Erica Wilcox
 Common as Edward Grens
 Clive Owen as Keith Montgomery
 Ana de Armas as Sofia Koslow
 Eugene Lipinski as Ryszard “The General” Klimek
 Joanna Kaczyńska as Beata Klimek
 Edwin de la Renta as Smiley Phelps
 Ruth Bradley as Cat
 Sam Spruell as Slewitt
 Aylam Orian as Andrzej Dziedzic
 Karma Meyer as Anna Koslow
 Mateusz Kościukiewicz as Staszek Cusik
 Peter Parker Mensah as Officer Franklin
 Arturo Castro as Daniel Gomez
 Abdul-Ahad Patel as Vermin

Production
The film adaptation of Three Seconds was announced at the Cannes Film Festival in 2017.
Filming took place in Pinewood Studios (UK), Iver Heath (UK), Gloucester Prison (UK) and Brooklyn, New York (US) in 2017.

Release
In September 2017, Aviron Pictures acquired U.S. distribution rights to the film, while Warner Bros. handled British distribution rights to the film. It was released on 6 November 2020, in the United States. It was originally scheduled to be released on 17 August 2018, which was delayed until 1 February 2019, and then to 22 March 2019. It was then further delayed multiple times due to financial problems involving Aviron. The film's first delay due to financial issues was until 16 August 2019, before being delayed again, to 10 January 2020, and then to 13 March 2020, and then to 31 July 2020, and then to 6 November 2020.

Redbox Entertainment and Vertical Entertainment distributed the DVD and Blu-Ray in the United States on its Redbox kiosks on 18 December 2020.

Reception
The site's critics consensus reads: "The Informer may prove a passable diversion for less demanding thriller fans, but most of its ingredients have been recycled from superior entries in the genre." On Metacritic the film has a weighted average score of 61 out of 100, based on 12 critics, indicating "generally favorable reviews".

Peter Bradshaw of The Guardian gives the film 3 out of 5 stars, and wrote: "It might have made better sense as an episodic drama on television but it is brash and watchable, its world reeking with cynicism and fear."
Tim Robey of The Telegraph gave the film 4 out of 5 stars, and wrote: "The Informer is one of the year's more pleasant genre surprises: a clenched fist of a crime thriller in the mode of The Departed or The Town, in which every element is just a notch smarter than you'd expect." Guy Lodge of Variety called it "a surprisingly well-oiled genre machine" and says it is a film  "that knows its limits, and works tidily within them".

References

External links
 

2019 films
2010s crime drama films
2019 crime thriller films
2019 thriller drama films
British crime drama films
British crime thriller films
British thriller drama films
Films based on Swedish novels
StudioCanal films
Warner Bros. films
2019 drama films
Films produced by Basil Iwanyk
Films about the Federal Bureau of Investigation
Films set in New York (state)
Fictional portrayals of the New York City Police Department
Thunder Road Films films
2010s English-language films
2010s American films
2010s British films